John Godwin (OFR, OBE) and Gillian Hopwood (MFR) are English architects, based in Nigeria.

Career
John and Gillian were born in England in 1928 and in 1927 respectively. They both studied architecture at the Architectural Association in London, both qualifying in 1950. John came to Nigeria with his wife, Gillian in 1954, residing in colonial Lagos, British Nigeria. They began their careers in architecture and were involved in designing many significant projects in the city. John also established an academic career as a Professor of Architecture at the University of Lagos. Although he collaborated with his wife on many projects, Gillian focused in historic preservation and architectural photography and documented several iconic buildings which existed in colonial Lagos (some of which have been demolished). They established their architectural firm named Godwin and Hopwood Architects in 1954. The firm’s name was later changed to Godwin Hopwood Kuye (GHK) Architects Limited in 1989. The couple became Nigerian citizens in 2013 after spending about 60 years living and practicing as architects in Nigeria.

Projects

 Allen and Hanbury House, Lagos
 WAEC building, Yaba, Lagos
 Bookshop House, Lagos
 Niger House, Lagos
 Nestle Nigeria Plc Water Plant, Lagos.
 Faculty of Sciences building, University of Lagos
 GlaxoSmith Headquarters building, Lagos.
 Boyle street residential building, Lagos.
 Bishop Court Building, Ikeja, Lagos

Published works

 The Architecture of Demas Nwoko. Published by Farafina in 2007

See also
 List of Nigerian architects

References

External links

1920s births
Living people
20th-century English architects
Alumni of the Architectural Association School of Architecture
Architects from Lagos
British emigrants to Nigeria
Married couples
Naturalized citizens of Nigeria
Nigerian architects
Nigerian people of English descent